Eosyodon is a dubious genus of extinct non-mammalian synapsids from the Permian of Texas. Its type and only species is Eosyodon hudsoni. Though it was originally interpreted as an early therapsid, it is probably a member of Sphenacodontidae, the family of synapsids that includes Dimetrodon.

Eosyodon hudsoni was named by Everett C. Olson in 1962 on the basis of fragmentary material from the San Angelo Formation in Texas. The species name honors J. Hudson, a ranch foreman who aided Olson's work. A femur, currently cataloged as FMNH UR 575, was designated the holotype, and skull fragments, partial ribs, and a few other bones were also assigned to the species. Olson interpreted Eosyodon as a therapsid closely related to Syodon, and assigned both genera to the family Brithopodidae of the infraorder Eotheriodontia. Eotheriodonta was a new taxon defined by Olson in the same paper, to encompass several taxa he regarded as a group of therapsids intermediate between pelycosaurs and later therapsids. 

In 1995, C. A. Sidor and J. A. Hopson presented a reevaluation of Olson's eotheriodonts at the annual conference of the Society of Vertebrate Paleontology, and concluded that they were based on caseid and sphenacodontid pelycosaurs. In 2011, Christian Kammerer agreed with their evaluation and concluded that Eosyodon was a sphenacodontid. He regarded Eosyodon as a nomen dubium.

Olson regarded the San Angelo fauna, including Eosyodon, as being from the early Guadalupian, chronologically equivalent to the Kazanian therapsid fauna of Russia. However, the San Angelo Formation is now regarded as belonging to the Kungurian stage of the Permian. As such, Eosyodon is somewhat older than the earliest definitive therapsids.

See also 

 List of pelycosaurs

References

Bibliography

Sphenacodontidae
Prehistoric synapsid genera
Permian synapsids of North America
Fossil taxa described in 1962
Taxa named by Everett C. Olson